Peel Session 2 is the second John Peel session that Autechre recorded. The tracks were given to Peel in August 1999 and aired on 8 September 1999. The EP was released by Warp Records at the end of 2000.

The artwork for Peel Session 2, created by The Designers Republic, is matte white lettering on a glossy white background with a matte white border. In the top left corner of the booklet cover, Autechre is written in black. Below this in white lettering is the EP title, Peel Session 2.

All tracks except for 19 Headaches were unnamed when given to John Peel. He himself named the tracks.

Track listing

References

2000 EPs
Peel Sessions recordings
Live EPs
Autechre EPs
2000 live albums
Warp (record label) live albums
Warp (record label) EPs
Albums with cover art by The Designers Republic